Democrats (D) is a Chilean political party founded in 2022 by former militants of the Christian Democratic Party, Party for Democracy and Radical Party, all former members from the defunct Concertación coalition.

History 

Its founders were senators Ximena Rincón and Matías Walker, as well as former presidential candidate Carlos Maldonado Curti. Most party members supported the «Reject» option in the 2022 constitutional plebiscite forming the Center-left for Reject movement (Centroizquerda por el Rechazo).

Democrats began their legalization procedures on November 4, 2022.

Ideology 

The movement defined itself as "centrist", although it acknowledged that it has center-left and center-right tendencies.

Democrats identified itself as a Christian democratic, humanist, pluralist, reformist, non-denominational, and regionalist party. They also see themselves as defenders of the legacy of the defunct Concertación coalition.

References

External links
 Democrats on Twitter

2022 establishments in Chile
Political parties in Chile
Political parties established in 2022
Centrist parties in South America